Höweler+Yoon (HYA) is a design-driven architecture practice and creative studio based in Boston, Massachusetts. It was founded in 2004 by Eric Höweler and Meejin Yoon. 

Yoon and Höweler first met while studying Architecture at Cornell University in 1990. They married in 2002 and founded Höweler+Yoon Architecture two years later.

Recent projects 

Höweler+Yoon has a reputation for work that is technologically and formally innovative, and deeply informed by human experience and a sensitivity to tectonics.

In 2020, HYA completed the Memorial to Enslaved Laborers at the University of Virginia, a landscape installation dedicated to enslaved laborers. The memorial was spontaneously inaugurated as a gathering place for group and individual contemplation during the national protests against racialized violence in June 2020.

The firm's other work includes the 212 Stuart Street multi-family residential tower (Boston), the MIT Museum (Cambridge, Massachusetts), and Float Lab, a public art installation and floating laboratory on the Schuylkill River (Philadelphia).

Work 
Höweler+Yoon's projects range from cultural and institutional buildings, mixed-use residential and commercial buildings, to public spaces, interactive environments, and research projects.

In 2003, the firm was commissioned to design an interactive public art piece for the Athens 2004 Summer Olympics. They went on to design the Boston Society of Architects Headquarters, the Sean Collier Memorial at MIT, Sky Courts Exhibition Hall (Chengdu, China), and Swing Time. They are known for working across the domains of architecture, urban design, public space, immersive experience, and design strategy.

Awards 
In 2012, Höweler+Yoon won the Audi Urban Future Award. Other notable awards include United States Artists Award in Architecture and Design in 2008, Architectural Record’s Design Vanguard Award in 2007, the Architecture League of New York’s Emerging Voices Award in 2007, and the Rome Prize in Design in 2005.  

HYA has won the BSA Honor Award (2015) for the Collier Memorial, as well as the AIA Small Project Award (2018) for the project "Shadow Play". In 2020, Höweler+Yoon was the winner of the NOMA/NAACP Seed Award and the AIA New England Honor Award for their UVA Memorial to Enslaved Laborers.

Publications

References

Architecture firms based in Massachusetts
Companies based in Boston
Design companies established in 2004
American companies established in 2004